The inauguration of Hage Geingob as the 3rd President of Namibia took place on Saturday, 21 March 2015. The inauguration marked the beginning of the first term of Hage Geingob as President following the general election. It coincided with the 25th independence anniversary celebrations.

Attendance

Dignitaries

Government representatives

Former leaders

International organisations

References

External links
 

Presidential inaugurations
March 2015 events in Africa